The Oneota Formation is a geologic formation in the upper Midwest (United States) including Minnesota, Illinois, Indiana and Wisconsin. It preserves marine fossils dating back to the Ordovician period.

The Sugar Loaf landmark located in Winona, Minnesota is made of Oneota Dolomite.

See also

 List of fossiliferous stratigraphic units in Wisconsin
 Paleontology in Wisconsin

References

Ordovician Minnesota
Ordovician Iowa
Ordovician geology of Wisconsin
Ordovician southern paleotropical deposits